Menlough is a Gaelic Athletic Association club based in Menlough, County Galway, Ireland. The club is a member of the Galway GAA. Menlough compete in the Galway Senior Club Football Championship.

References

Gaelic football clubs in County Galway
Gaelic games clubs in County Galway